Three Holes is a hamlet near Upwell in Norfolk, England. Located on the border of Norfolk and Cambridgeshire, the two sides of the river are in separate counties.

Further reading

References

Hamlets in Norfolk
King's Lynn and West Norfolk